Marshal Humberto de Alencar Castelo Branco (September 20, 1897 – July 18, 1967) was a Brazilian military leader and politician. He served as the first president of the Brazilian military dictatorship after the 1964 military coup d'etat. Castelo Branco was killed in an aircraft collision in July 1967, soon after the end of his presidency.

Family background
Castelo Branco was born in a wealthy Northeastern Brazilian family having roots in Coura (Paredes de Coura), Portugal. His father, Cândido Borges Castelo Branco, was a general. His mother, Antonieta Alencar Castelo Branco, came from a family of intellectuals (which included the writer José de Alencar).

He was married to Argentina Vianna, and had two children, Nieta and Paulo.

Military career
Castelo Branco joined the Brazilian Army at Rio Pardo Military School in Rio Grande do Sul. In 1918, he joined the Military School of Realengo in Rio de Janeiro, as an infantry cadet, and was declared second lieutenant in 1921, being assigned to the 12th Infantry Regiment in Belo Horizonte. In 1923 he reached the rank of first lieutenant. In 1924, still as lieutenant, he completed the Infantry Advanced Course and, upon returning to the 12th RI, was assigned the task of commanding a detachment from the unit and integrating legal forces that would come to grips with and overcome revolts interns hatched in São Paulo in the year 1925. He then returned to the Military School of Realengo as an infantry instructor in 1927. He participated, like many other lieutenants of his time, in the Brazilian Revolution of 1930.

As Captain, the intellectual value of Castello Branco stood out and, in 1931, he attended the Command and General Staff College (ECEME), in which he was the first placed of his class. Promoted to Major in 1938, he was enrolled in the French War College and upon returning to Brazil, he served as an instructor at the Military School of Realengo.

He was promoted to lieutenant colonel in 1943 and attended the Command and General Staff College in the United States. Then he was head of the 3rd. Section (Operations) of the Brazilian Expeditionary Force (FEB) during World War II, in Italy, remaining for three hundred days on the battle fields. He sent sixty letters to his wife, Argentina Viana Castelo Branco, and his two sons. At FEB, he planned and implemented military maneuvers in combat in Italy, especially at the Battle of Monte Castello. According to Marshal Cordeiro de Farias, Castello won exceptional prestige at FEB, for being a great strategist and having a privileged head.

Promoted to Colonel in 1945, Castelo Branco returned to Brazil with the firm intention of transmitting his professional experiences to the officers of the Army. In this way, it assumed the position of Director of Studies of the ECEME, and transformed this school into a true center of doctrinal investigations. Castelo Branco systematized, mainly between 1946 and 1947, the reasoning method for the study of decision factors, recommended by the French Military Mission, with a structure of work within the command, better disciplining the activities of the Commander and his Staff Officers.

In 1955, he helped with the Army's administrative reshaping and supported the military movement headed by the Minister of War, General Henrique Teixeira Lott, who secured the inauguration of President-elect Juscelino Kubitschek, who at that time was threatened with a military coup.

Months later, when trade union organizations resolved to hand over to the Minister a golden sword, Castelo severely broke with General Lott. The press recorded a few moments of this misunderstanding.

As General, he commanded ECEME, between September 15, 1954, and January 3, 1956. During this period, he perfected his Command Work of 1948, seeking to better suit him characteristics of Brazilian Chiefs and Staff Officers. Conferences such as "The War Doctrine and the Modern War" and "Security Problems", held in ECEME, are milestones in the evolution of the doctrinal thinking of this school.

He also commanded the 8th Military Region in Belém, the 10th Military Region in Fortaleza and the IV Army in Recife. At the time he reached the Presidency of the Republic he was Chief of Staff of the Army, a position he held from September 13, 1963, to April 14, 1964.

Political career
Castelo Branco became one of the leaders of the 1964 Brazilian coup d'état that overthrew Goulart and ended the Fourth Brazilian Republic. On April 11, Congress chose him to serve out the remainder of Goulart's term and he took the oath of office on April 15, 1964.

Castelo Branco was the second Brazilian Field Marshal to become President of the nation through a coup d'état, the first was Deodoro da Fonseca, who deposed Emperor Pedro II of Brazil in 1889, ended the Brazilian Empire and established the First Brazilian Republic.

Castelo Branco was vested with emergency powers under the First Institutional Act, which among other things allowed him to cancel the political rights of "subversive elements" for ten years. He was otherwise committed to permitting normal political activities while carrying out reform through legislation. In March 1965 municipal elections were held as planned. Castelo Branco had every intention of turning over power to a civilian president when his term was due to run out in 1966. However, the hard-line officers within the regime (known as linha-dura) with the support of War Minister Artur da Costa e Silva, wanted to stay in power for a greater period of time in order to achieve their political goals. Events reached a breaking point in October 1965, when opposition candidates won the governorships of the major states of Minas Gerais and Guanabara. Hard-liners demanded that Castelo Branco annul the results, but he refused.  Another coup was averted after  Costa e Silva persuaded hard-liners to recognize the election results in return for Castelo Branco's promise to implement a tougher policy.

Thereafter, Castelo Branco dropped all pretense of democracy. On October 27, 1965, he issued the Second Institutional Act, which abolished all existing political parties, restored his emergency powers, and extended his term to 1967. The numerous political parties were replaced with only two: the pro-government National Renewal Alliance Party (ARENA) and the opposition Brazilian Democratic Movement (MDB). In 1967, he convened an extraordinary commission of jurists that drafted a highly authoritarian constitution.

Castelo Branco issued many repressive laws, most notably a highly draconian press law (Lei de Imprensa) near the end of his term. This law continued to be valid in Brazil until 2009, when it was struck down by Brazil's Supreme Federal Court.

He was succeeded in Presidency by Costa e Silva at midnight on March 15, 1967.

Castelo Branco promoted government intervention into the economy (e.g., shutting down by decree the country's flag carrier, Panair do Brasil). Castelo Branco's government, unlike previous directly elected Presidents Juscelino Kubitschek, Jânio Quadros and João Goulart, was bankrolled from the start by the credits and loans from World Bank, International Monetary Fund and massive investment from multinational American companies, which saw the Brazilian right-wing military dictatorship as a new, economically stable Western ally against international communism in Latin America during the Cold War.

Death

Four months after leaving the Presidency, Castelo Branco died in a midair collision of small aircraft near Fortaleza on 18 July 1967.

Honours

Foreign honours

  Grand Officer of the Military Order of Aviz (October 12, 1945)
  Grand Cross of the Legion of Honour (October 14, 1964) 
  Grand Collar of the Order of Prince Henry (July 21, 1965)
 Grand Collar of the Order of Merit of the Italian Republic (September 8, 1965)

See also
 1964 Brazilian coup d'état
 List of presidents of Brazil
 History of Brazil (1964-present)

References

External links

|-

1897 births
1967 deaths
People from Fortaleza
Brazilian people of Portuguese descent
Marshals of Brazil
State leaders killed in aviation accidents or incidents
Brazilian anti-communists
Geopoliticians
Brazilian military personnel of World War II
Presidents of Brazil
Military dictatorship in Brazil
People of the Cold War
Victims of aviation accidents or incidents in Brazil
Victims of aviation accidents or incidents in 1967
Leaders who took power by coup
Conservatism in Brazil